Laura Asadauskaitė-Zadneprovskienė (born 28 February 1984 in Vilnius) is a Lithuanian modern pentathlete. She won the gold medal at the 2012 Summer Olympics in London and achieved an Olympic record score. Asadauskaitė also competed in three other Olympics, 2008 in Beijing,  2016 in Rio de Janeiro, and in 2021 in Tokyo Olympics in which she was awarded with the silver medal. She has been European and World Champion in pentathlon.

In 2009 Asadauskaitė married modern pentathlete Andrejus Zadneprovskis, a former world champion who won two Olympic medals. The following year she gave birth to a daughter. She is a graduate of Mykolas Romeris University, majoring in Administration and European Union Policy.

References
  MSNBC. Laura Asadauskaitė, Modern Pentathlon.

External links
 

1984 births
Living people
Lithuanian female modern pentathletes
Olympic modern pentathletes of Lithuania
Modern pentathletes at the 2008 Summer Olympics
Modern pentathletes at the 2012 Summer Olympics
Modern pentathletes at the 2016 Summer Olympics
Sportspeople from Vilnius
Olympic gold medalists for Lithuania
Olympic silver medalists for Lithuania
Olympic medalists in modern pentathlon
Lithuanian Sportsperson of the Year winners
Medalists at the 2012 Summer Olympics
Medalists at the 2020 Summer Olympics
World Modern Pentathlon Championships medalists
Mykolas Romeris University alumni
Modern pentathletes at the 2020 Summer Olympics